Didzis Matīss (born 10 December 1980) is a Latvian football manager. He was the head coach of the Latvia women's national football team from 2010 until July 2021.

References

1980 births
Living people
Latvian football managers
Women's national association football team managers
Latvia women's national football team
Football managers in Latvia